Richard "Dimples" Fields (March 21, 1942 – January 12, 2000) was an American R&B and soul singer, popular during the 1980s.

Career
He was born in New Orleans, Louisiana. He began singing professionally in the early 1970s, purchasing an Oakland cabaret, the Cold Duck Music Lounge, where he headlined. He took his nickname, "Dimples", from a female admirer who remarked that he was always smiling.

He began recording for his own DRK label, before signing to Boardwalk Records in 1981. His first minor hit was a cover of The Penguins' "Earth Angel" that year. His first album for Boardwalk also featured the track "She's Got Papers On Me", the lament of a married man wanting his mistress, which was interrupted by his wife, played by Betty Wright, setting out her view of the situation.

Fields' breakthrough single came in 1982 with "If It Ain't One Thing, It's Another", which reached number one for three weeks on the US Billboard R&B chart and number 47 on the Billboard Hot 100. He had first recorded and released the song for DRK in 1975, in which he lamented not only the world's problems, but also those of his own life (from an ugly pregnant girlfriend to the need to read the Bible). Fields was persuaded to re-record and update it by an old friend, including it on his album Mr. Look So Good!, before it was issued as a single. His only entry in the UK Singles Chart occurred in February 1982, when "I've Got to Learn to Say No" peaked at number 56.

While Fields had moderate success on the US R&B chart, both under his name and his nickname, "Dimples", "If It Ain't One Thing, It's Another" was his only Billboard Hot 100 entry. His other big seller was "Your Wife Is Cheating On Us".

He had several less successful follow-ups before Boardwalk Records folded in 1983. He then signed with RCA Records, but was dropped by the label after several unsuccessful singles and albums. Renamed simply "Dimples", he continued to record for the Columbia and Life record labels. He also worked as a record producer with 9.9, and The Ohio Players among others.

Fields died in Novato, California, in January 2000, at the age of 57, as the result of a stroke.

References

1942 births
2000 deaths
American record producers
American rhythm and blues singers
20th-century American businesspeople
20th-century African-American male singers